John Graham (born 1873 in Northumberland, date of death unknown) was an English footballer. His regular position was as a centre forward. He played for Blyth and Newton Heath.

Graham played for Blyth in his native Northumberland before joining Newton Heath in October 1893. He made his debut on 11 October 1893 in the 1–1 draw with Wolverhampton Wanderers, but played only three further games before leaving league football.

References

External links
Profile at StretfordEnd.co.uk
Profile at MUFCinfo.com

1873 births
Year of death missing
English footballers
Association football forwards
Manchester United F.C. players
English Football League players